Greg Battle (born April 14, 1964) is a former Canadian Football League linebacker for the Winnipeg Blue Bombers.

He graduated from Arizona State University. He had a tryout with the Denver Broncos of the NFL but turned north to Canada in 1987.

He won two CFL Outstanding Defensive player awards in his career, 1990 and 1991, and helped the Blue Bombers to two Grey Cup victories in 1988 and 1990. He finished his career third in the CFL for career defensive tackles with 766. He was named one of the All-Time Blue Bomber Greats. As a senior, Battle accumulated 147 tackles and took home Honorable Mention All-America honors from the Associated Press. He was chosen the Eastern Division outstanding defensive player three times (1989, 1990 and 1991) and the CFL's top defensive player in 1990 and 1991. He was named the Grey Cup's defensive MVP in 1990, when he recorded four tackles and two interceptions, returning one for a 56-yard touchdown in a 50–11 victory over the Edmonton Eskimos. During the game one sports caster jokingly asked if he could nominate Battle for most outstanding offensive player due to his interceptions. During his time in the CFL he was known for his Pass coverage skills, and outstanding speed.
 
Battle also briefly played for the Las Vegas Posse in 1994 and the Ottawa Rough Riders in the same season, the Memphis Mad Dogs in 1995 and the Saskatchewan Roughriders in 1996 before returning to the Blue Bombers for his two final seasons.

In 2007, Battle was inducted into the Canadian Football Hall of Fame.

References 

1964 births
Living people
Arizona State Sun Devils football players
Canadian Football Hall of Fame inductees
Canadian Football League Most Outstanding Defensive Player Award winners
Las Vegas Posse players
Memphis Mad Dogs players
Ottawa Rough Riders players
Saskatchewan Roughriders players
Winnipeg Blue Bombers players
Players of American football from Long Beach, California
Players of Canadian football from Long Beach, California